The Dutch Basketball League Most Valuable Player Award is an annual award given to the most valuable player in the Dutch highest professional basketball league. The award is given after the regular season and was first handed out in 1974. Six Dutch players have won the award so far, with Arvin Slagter being the last in 2014. Kees Akerboom, Sr. (1980, 1981, 1985) and Leon Rodgers (2005–2007) are the all-time leaders in Dutch MVP awards.

Winners

Awards by player

Awards won by nationality

References

Basketball most valuable player awards
European basketball awards
 
Dutch Basketball League awards